Mount Hodson is an ice-covered stratovolcano and the highest point on Visokoi Island, South Sandwich Islands. It might have erupted in 1830 and 1930, and the summit usually steams. Named after Sir Arnold Wienholt Hodson (1881-1944), Governor of the Falkland Islands and Dependencies, 1926–30.

See also
List of volcanoes in South Sandwich Islands

References

Volcanoes of South Georgia and the South Sandwich Islands
Mountains and hills of South Georgia and the South Sandwich Islands
Holocene stratovolcanoes
Active volcanoes